The Temenos Academy, or Temenos Academy of Integral Studies, is an educational charity in London which aims to offer education in philosophy and the arts in what it calls "the light of the sacred traditions of East and West".

The academy's background came from the Temenos journal, which was launched in 1980 by Kathleen Raine, Keith Critchlow, Brian Keeble and Philip Sherrard to publish creative work which regarded spirituality as a prime need for humanity. Ten years later the academy was founded to extend the project through lectures and study groups. It was accommodated initially in the Prince of Wales's Institute of Architecture in Regent's Park. Since the closure of the institute, the academy now holds meetings in different venues in London.

People associated with the academy
Lecturers include Hossein Elahi Ghomshei and Z'ev ben Shimon Halevi (Warren Kenton). The academy staged a talk by the Dalai Lama during his visit to London in 2004. The journal Temenos was continued as the Temenos Academy Review.

References

External links

Charles III
1990 establishments in England
Spiritual organizations
Organizations established in 1990
Religious organisations based in London
Traditionalist School